Villasalto, Bidda de Sartu or Bidda de Saltu in sardinian language, is a Comune/Comunu (municipality) in the Province of South Sardinia in the Italian region Sardinia, located about  northeast of Cagliari.

Villasalto/Biddesatu borders the following municipalities: Armungia, Burcei, Dolianova, San Nicolò Gerrei, San Vito, Sinnai, Villaputzu.

Demographic evolution

References

Cities and towns in Sardinia